Kevvu Keka is a 2013 Telugu-language comedy film written and directed by Devi Prasad, produced by Boppana Chandrasekhar under Jahnavi Productions banner and starring Allari Naresh and Sharmiela Mandre in the lead roles. Cinematography is handled by Adusumilli Vijay Kumar and editing will be done by Hari Nandamuri. Soundtrack for the film will be composed by Bheems Ceciroleo and Chinni Charan. The film was released on 19 July 2013. In 2017, it was dubbed into Hindi as Daring Chalbaaz by WAM India Movies.

Plot
Buchi Raju is a salesman in Kalanikethan Mall who lives with his uncle Abrakadabra Appa Rao, who is a magician. Buchi Raju happens to come across Maha Lakshmi one fine day and falls in love with her. Maha Lakshmi also responds to Buchi Rahju, and they fall in love. Maha Lakshmi’s father Subba Rao does not approve of this alliance because as Buchi Raju is not rich. To win Maha Lakshmi's hand, Buchi Raju promises to earn much money within six months and leaves. Through Appa Rao, he learns of a Bangkok businessman named Gottam Gopalakrishna and a fortune that is waiting for him. Armed with this information, Buchi Raju decides to go to Bangkok to seek his money.

Cast

 Allari Naresh as Bhucchi Raju
 Sharmiela Mandre as Maha Lakshmi
 Ali as Appal Raju
 M. S. Narayana as Subba Rao
 Ashish Vidyarthi as Gottam Gopalakrishna
 Krishna Bhagavaan as Abrakadabra Appa Rao
 Prudhviraj as Punctuality Prabhanjanam 
 Kiran Rathod as Mrs. Gottam Gopalakrishna / Jaanu
 Khayyum
 Chalapathi Rao 
 Geetha Singh
 Jeeva
 Dhanraj
 Jyoti Labala as Alaknanda
 Shanoor Sana
 Tharika
 Apoorva
 Nagaraj Yadav
 Mumaith Khan (cameo)

Production

Development
Allari Naresh and Devi Prasad previously worked together in 2008 successful film Blade Babji. Initial news of the film and the title were reported on 22 July 2012. On the same day, Naresh through his Twitter account confirmed that his next project would be with Devi Prasad and that the film was titled Kevvu Keka. It was also reported that the film would be officially launched on 25 July 2012.  On 25 July, the launch event was organized at Ramanaidu Studios in Hyderabad and was attended by Akkineni Nageswara Rao as chief guest. The muhurat shot was filmed and a press meet was held revealing the additional details about the project. It was announced that the popular writer Satish Vegesna, who previously collaborated with Naresh for several films would handle the dialogues and script of the film. It was announced that both Devi Prasad and Satish Vegesna has worked for over three years on the film script and Gutti Madhu would act as script coordinator for the film. It was also announced that cinematography would be handled by Vijay Kumar and the music would be composed collaboratively by two music composers: Bheems and Chinni Charan.  During the press meet, it was revealed that the film would be released in 2013 and would star a new heroine opposite Naresh. The film title was inspired by a song from the 2012 film Gabbar Singh. On 3 October, reports emerged that Kannada actress Sharmiela Mandre was cast as heroine in the film, this was later confirmed by her in an interview. This would be her debut film in Tollywood.

Filming
The regular filming began on 3 October 2012 in Hyderabad. It was also announced that the major part of filming would be done in Hyderabad and Bangkok. A press note was released by the producers announcing the entire film schedule. It was announced that the first schedule of filming would take place from 1 November 2012 to 15 November 2012 in the surroundings of Hyderabad. The second schedule would take place from 5 December 2012 to 20 December 2012. The last and final schedule would take place in Bangkok from 15 January 2013 to 12 February 2013 with which the filming would be wrapped. At Last Allari Naresh Kevvu Keka Movie Shooting Completed

Overseas
Kevvu Keka US Schedules

Soundtrack

The soundtrack of the film was composed by Bheems and Chinni Charan and released through Aditya Music label on 30 June 2013. The album consists of four songs. Lyrics for the four songs were penned by Bheems, SriMani, Ketharinath and Suddala Ashok Teja.

References

External links
 

2013 films
2013 comedy films
Films shot in Bangkok
2010s Telugu-language films
Indian films with live action and animation
Films scored by Bheems Ceciroleo